Nikolay Vasilyevich Ivanov (born 14 June 1980) is a former Russian professional association football player.

Club career
Ivanov has two spells with FC Metallurg Lipetsk in the Russian Football National League and Russian Second Division, from 2002 until 2005 and from 2007 until 2009.

References

External links
 
 

1980 births
People from Yelets
Living people
Russian footballers
Association football defenders
FC Metallurg Lipetsk players
FC Volgar Astrakhan players
FC Sodovik Sterlitamak players
FC Tyumen players
FC Vityaz Podolsk players
FC Torpedo Moscow players
FC Orenburg players
FC Spartak-UGP Anapa players
Sportspeople from Lipetsk Oblast